Jean-Julien Rojer and Horia Tecău were the defending champions but chose not to participate.  Jonathan Erlich and Colin Fleming won the title, defeating Chris Guccione and André Sá in the final, 6–1, 6–7(3–7), [10–6].

Seeds

Draw

Draw

External links
 Main Draw

ATP Shenzhen Open - Doubles
2015 Doubles